Jacques Leslie is an author and journalist.  He was a war correspondent for the Los Angeles Times during the Vietnam war.  His wife's name is Leslie and, therefore, goes by the name of Leslie Leslie.

Education
Leslie obtained his B.A. in American Studies from Yale University and graduated with departmental honors. He was a Yale-China fellow from 1968–70 and was a tutor in English at Chinese University of Hong Kong.

Awards and honors
Leslie has won a number of awards for his work which include:
Winner, 2006 Drunken Boat Panliterary Award in Nonfiction for "Lisa's Shoe."
Finalist, 2006 Northern California Book Award in Nonfiction for Deep Water. 
Deep Water named one of the top science books of 2005 by Discover Magazine. 
Winner, 2002 J. Anthony Lukas Work-in-Progress Award for Deep Water. 
Finalist, 2001 John B. Oakes Award in Distinguished Environmental Journalism, for "Running Dry: What Happens When the World No Longer Has Enough Freshwater?" published in Harper's Magazine, July 2000.
Recipient, Marin (California) Arts Council grant for Creative Nonfiction, 2003 and 1999.
The Mark named "one of the top censored books of 1995" by the 1996 Project Censored Yearbook.
Pulitzer Prize nomination, Los Angeles Times, for foreign correspondence (India), 1975.
Winner, Sigma Delta Chi Distinguished Service Award for best newspaper foreign correspondence, 1973.
Winner, Overseas Press Club citation, 1973, "for incisive, consistently well-researched coverage of Vietnam and the Vietcong."
Pulitzer Prize Nomination, Los Angeles Times, for foreign correspondence (Vietnam), 1973.

Books

Deep Water: The Epic Struggle Over Dams, Displaced People, and the Environment, Farrar, Straus & Giroux, August 2005.
The Mark: A War Correspondent's Memoir of Vietnam and Cambodia, published by Four Walls Eight Windows in Spring, 1995.

Magazines

His work has been published in a number of magazines including: The Atlantic Monthly, The New York Times Magazine, Mother Jones, Orion, Wired, OnEarth, Newsweek, Washington Monthly, Columbia Journalism Review, Reader's Digest, among many others.

References

External links
 Red Room biography
 Personal web site "Under Construction
This site is being revamped and updated. It will be back up soon."

American war correspondents